Frenštát pod Radhoštěm is a town in Nový Jičín District in the Moravian-Silesian Region of the Czech Republic. It has about 11,000 inhabitants. The historic town centre is well preserved and is protected by law as an urban monument zone.

Administrative parts
Frenštát pod Radhoštěm is made up of one administrative part.

Geography
Frenštát pod Radhoštěm lies at the confluence of the Lomná and Lubina rivers. The town is located in the Moravian-Silesian Foothills and extends into the Moravian-Silesian Beskids at the western tip. The mountain of Radhošť, contained in the name of the town, is located south of the town outside the municipal territory.

History

The first written mention of Frenštát is from 1382. It was probably founded during the colonization between 1293 and 1316. In 1473, tt was first referred to as a market town. In the 16th century, it became a prosperous market town with developed trade and handicrafts.

The Thirty Years' War affected the town severely as it was burned down in 1626, and occupied by the Swedes in 1646. The plague epidemic also affected Frenštát. In the 17th century, the economy grew, possibly due to being colonized by the Wallachians. In 1781, Frenštát was promoted to a town. 

In the second half of the 19th century, the industrialization occurred. Weaving switched to mechanical factory production, other important industries were dyeing, hosiery and the production of bentwood furniture. The development was supported by the opening of the railway in 1888. In 1921, Frenštát was renamed Frenštát pod Radhoštěm. The development ended with the World War II as the town was occupied by the Axis, but was liberated on 6 May 1945. After the war there was an extensive housing construction.

Demographics

Sport
Frenštát pod Radhoštěm is known as a ski centre. There is a complex with four ski jumps.

Frenštát pod Radhoštěm is home to a football team, SK Beskyd Frenštát pod Radhoštěm, which competes in the lower amateur tiers.

Sights

The town square is lined by preserved burgher houses. The landmark of the square is the two-storey Neorenaissance town hall. It was built in the Italianizing spirit in 1889–1891 on the site of an older town hall from 1796, and has an accessible tower. The interior is decorated by several valuable sculptures, including the original of the sculpture of Slavic god Radegast, created by Albin Polasek in 1929 and originally placed on Radhošť.

The Church of Saint Martin was built in the early Baroque style in 1661. The Baroque chapels of St. Barbara and St. John of Nepomuk were added in around 1740.

The boys' middle-class school from 1876 was the second Czech school in Moravia. Today the building is a cultural monument and houses the town museum.

A technical monument is a fruit dryer built by design of Dušan Jurkovič in 1899.

Notable people
Albin Polasek (1879–1965), Czech-American sculptor and educator
Bohuslav Fiala (1890–1964), brigadier general
Břetislav Bartoš (1893–1926), painter
Záviš Kalandra (1902–1950), historian and theorist
Zdeněk Parma (1925–2006), alpine skier
Ladislav Adamec (1926–2007), politician, Prime Minister of Czechoslovakia in 1988–1989
Jiří Raška (1941–2012), ski jumper, Olympic winner
Karel Loprais (1949–2021), rally raid driver; lived here
Jiří Parma (born 1963), ski jumper
Iveta Bartošová (1966–2014), singer; grew up here

Twin towns – sister cities

Frenštát pod Radhoštěm is twinned with:
 Harrachov, Czech Republic
 Krásno nad Kysucou, Slovakia
 La Grange, United States
 Ustroń, Poland

Gallery

References

External links

Tourist Information Centre

Cities and towns in the Czech Republic
Populated places in Nový Jičín District
Moravian Wallachia